Aksel Madsen (athlete)
 Aksel Madsen (footballer)